Kainoa Lloyd (born 21 May 1994) is a Canadian rugby union player who plays as a winger for the Toronto Arrows in Major League Rugby (MLR), the Ontario Blues in the Canadian Rugby Championship and Canada internationally.

References

1994 births
Living people
Canadian rugby union players
Rugby union centres
Rugby union wings
Sportspeople from Mississauga
Toronto Arrows players
Canada international rugby union players
San Diego Legion players